Dong-gu Office Station is a station of Daegu Subway Line 1 in Sinam-dong, Dong District, Daegu, South Korea. It is located at Keungogae five-way crossing (큰고개오거리).

External links 

 DTRO virtual station

Dong District, Daegu
Daegu Metro stations
Railway stations opened in 1998